The Dennert Fir Tree ( also known as the ,  or ) is a signboard that is used throughout the Harz mountains in Germany to provide information about mining and other points of interest in the area. The signboards mark locations, traces and monuments to mining, to the Upper Harz Water Regale, a medieval water management system, or even personalities in mining history in the Upper Harz mining area. They have since become used to document other notable sites within the Harz.

The first Dennert Fir Tree was set up on 9 October 1949 in the vicinity of the former Sarepta Pit in Clausthal. It was sponsored by the Power and Water Management Division of Preussag AG, the operator of the Upper Harz Water Regalem at that time. The instigator was  Herbert Dennert (1902–1994). Dennert promoted the preservation of mining monuments and published several books about mining in the Upper Harz.

The signs measure , are mainly made of wood and have the characteristic shape of a stylised fir tree. They are painted yellow with a green and black border. Underneath a hammer and pick symbol the type of site is described together with important information. The texts were researched and published from 1949 to 1981 by Herbert Dennert.

Dennert Fir Trees that are set up by municipalities or branches of the Harz Club have the shield of their respective village at the top instead of the hammer and pick. For example, the Braunlage branch sponsors around 60 signs (as at April 9).

Sources

External links 

 until 2021: Collection of Dennert Fir Trees from D.Lübker
 from August 2021: Collection of Dennert Fir Trees from R.Ostrowski
 Dennert Fir Trees in OpenStreetMap
 List and location map of the Dennert Fir Trees of the Harz Club - Braunlage Branch (pdf file; 445 kB)

Mining in the Harz